Newtown, an electoral district of the Legislative Assembly in the Australian state of New South Wales, has had four incarnations, the first from 1859 to 1894, the second from 1904 until 1920, the third from 1927 until 1950 and the fourth from 2015 until the present.


Members

First incarnation 1859-1894

Election results

Elections in the 2010s

2019

2015

1950 - 2015
District abolished

Elections in the 1940s

1947

1944

1941

Elections in the 1930s

1938

1935

1932

1930

Elections in the 1920s

1927

1920 - 1927
District abolished

Elections in the 1910s

1917

1913

1910

Elections in the 1900s

1907

1904

1894 - 1904

Elections in the 1890s

1891

Elections in the 1880s

1889

1888 by-election 2

1888 by-election 1

1887

1885

1883 by-election

1882

1881 by-election

1880

Elections in the 1870s

1877

1874

1872

Elections in the 1860s

1869

1864

1861 by-election

1860

Elections in the 1850s

1859

References

New South Wales state electoral results by district